John Dougherty is a Northern Irish children's writer, born in the town of Larne in 1964. He now lives in Gloucestershire.

He worked as a primary school teacher in London during the 1990s and early 2000s;  during this period, he began to write stories for children. His first book was published in 2004 and he left teaching the same year to concentrate on his writing career.

From November 2013 – 2015, he was chair of the Children's Writers and Illustrators Group (CWIG), a sub-group of the UK's Society of Authors.

Published books
Stinkbomb & Ketchup-Face
Stinkbomb & Ketchup-Face and the Badness of Badgers (2014)
Stinkbomb & Ketchup-Face and the Quest for the Magic Porcupine (2014)
Stinkbomb & Ketchup-Face and the Evilness of Pizza (2015)
Stinkbomb & Ketchup-Face and the Bees of Stupidity (2015)
Stinkbomb & Ketchup-Face and the Great Big Story Nickers (2016)
Stinkbomb & Ketchup-Face and the Great Kerfuffle Christmas Kidnap (2016)
all above illustrated by David Tazzyman

Picture books
There's a Pig Up My Nose (2017), with illustrator Laura Hughes

Zeus
Zeus on the Loose (2004)
Zeus to the Rescue (2007)
Zeus Sorts It Out (2011)

Bansi O'Hara
Bansi O'Hara and the Bloodline Prophecy (2008)
Bansi O'Hara and the Edges of Hallowe'en (2011)

Jack Slater
Jack Slater, Monster Investigator (2006)
Jack Slater and the Whisper of Doom (2009)

Stand-alones
Niteracy Hour (2005)
Mark & Shark: Detectiving & Stuff (2019)

Reading books for schools include
Finn MacCool & the Giant's Causeway (2011) - a retelling of the Irish legend for the Oxford Reading Tree
Twice Upon a Time (2014) - part of the Treetops Chucklers (OUP) range
A Midsummer Night's Dream (2014) - a retelling of the Shakespeare story for the Collins' Big Cats range
The Story of Sir Dave (2014) - part of the OUP Project X range
The Tempest (2015) - a retelling of the Shakespeare story for the Collins' Big Cats range
Astron (2015) - for the Oxford Reading Tree
The Fall of Julius Caesar (2017) - a retelling of the Shakespeare story for the Collins' Big Cats range
Antony & Cleopatra (2017) - a retelling of the Shakespeare story for the Collins' Big Cats range
Holiday of a Lifetime (2019) - for Treetops (OUP)

Poetry
Dinosaurs & Dinner-Ladies (2016), illustrated by Tom Morgan-Jones

Awards and nominations
Zeus on the Loose was shortlisted for the Branford Boase Award 2005
Niteracy Hour was shortlisted for the Nottingham Children's Book Prize 2006 and the Coventry Inspiration Raring 2 Read Award 2008
Jack Slater, Monster Investigator was shortlisted for the Ottakars' Children's Book Prize 2006
Stinkbomb & Ketchup-Face and the Great Big Story Nickers was shortlisted for the inaugural Eugenie Summerfield Children's Book Prize 2018
There's a Pig Up My Nose won Oscar's Book Prize 2018
Mark & Shark: Detecting & Stuff was a runner-up in the Coventry Inspiration Book Awards 2021

References

External links
 
 John Dougherty, author at literary agent AM Heath & Co Ltd
 Author webpage at publisher Oxford University Press 
 John Dougherty, author at publisher Random House

1964 births
British children's writers
Male writers from Northern Ireland
Living people
21st-century writers from Northern Ireland